Richard Steven Horvitz (born July 29, 1966) is an American actor and comedian, best known for his voice work in animation and video games. His voice credits include the original Alpha 5 on Mighty Morphin Power Rangers, Power Rangers Zeo and Power Rangers Turbo, Razputin in Psychonauts, Kaos in Skylanders, Billy and his father Harold in Grim & Evil and The Grim Adventures of Billy & Mandy, Grey Matter in Ben 10, Rodney in Squirrel Boy, Daggett in The Angry Beavers, Zim in Invader Zim, Orthopox in Destroy All Humans!, the Zoni in Ratchet & Clank, Bumble in Kinectimals, the Space Weaver in Broken Age, Kanchomé in Zatch Bell!, and Moxxie in Helluva Boss.

Early life
Horvitz was born on July 29, 1966, in Los Angeles, California. His older brother, Louis J. Horvitz, is a television director and producer.

Career

Voice acting

Horvitz first appeared in a 1976 Freshen Up gum commercial, which led to other commercial appearances and several hand modeling jobs. After a brief stint in an off-Broadway production of Oliver! he went on to make appearances on television series such as Kids Incorporated and Safe at Home, and films such as Summer School, How I Got into College, and Deadly Weapon. From 1988 to 1991, he starred as Howie for two seasons in the syndicated television sitcom The Munsters Today.

Starting in 1993, Horvitz changed the focus of his career to voice acting, starting with the voice of Alpha 5 in the live-action series Mighty Morphin Power Rangers. From there, he had several other voice roles in such animated series as The Angry Beavers (as Daggett), Invader Zim (as Zim), Kim Possible, Dave the Barbarian (as Ned Frischman), Zatch Bell! (as Kanchomé), The Grim Adventures of Billy & Mandy (as Billy and his father Harold), Ben 10 (as Grey Matter), Squirrel Boy (as Rodney), and Shorty McShorts' Shorts (as Dudley). He also co-wrote the Grim Adventures of Billy and Mandy episode "Keeper of the Reaper" alongside his wife Kristen Lazarian.

After his stint as Alpha 5 ended, Horvitz went on to voice a few monsters in other Power Rangers series and was also the voice of Alpha 7 in the Power Rangers Wild Force episode "Forever Red". He voiced the main characters of Raz in the Psychonauts series and Orthopox in the Destroy All Humans! series. He has also voiced various NPCs in EverQuest II, the Berserker Darklings in The Darkness, Bumble in Kinectimals, and Kaos in Skylanders: Spyro's Adventure.

Horvitz voiced "Green Grapes" in the Fruit of the Loom commercials and has acted on stage, including in Jeffrey Hatcher's Mrs. Mannerly.

Horvitz also voiced Moxxie and served as voice director in the adult animated web series Helluva Boss. He is set to reprise the role of Alpha 5 in the Netflix special "Mighty Morphin Power Rangers: Once & Always", which will celebrate the 30th anniversary of the Power Rangers franchise.

Comedy
In 2001, Horvitz did not create, but was in the sketch comedy group The MoHos with Fred Willard, created by his wife Mary. He and Fred would sometimes perform on various talk shows including Jimmy Kimmel Live! and The Tonight Show with Jay Leno. Horvitz also appeared in an episode of Saturday Night Live in the short segment "Bear City" and briefly appeared on Tosh.0.

Personal life
Horvitz married playwright and screenwriter Kristen Lazarian on February 9, 1996. They currently live in Los Angeles and have three sons together.

Filmography

Live-action
 Babylon 5 – Mark
 Cats & Dogs – Puppy at Barn (voice, uncredited)
 Crazy, Stupid, Love – Hardware Store Assistant
 Fruit of the Loom Commercials – Green Grapes
 Head of the Class – Oswald Bletch
 I Know That Voice – Himself
 Mighty Morphin Power Rangers: The Movie – Alpha 5 (voice)
 Mighty Morphin Power Rangers/Zeo/Turbo – Alpha 5 (voice, credited as Richard Wood)
 Power Rangers in Space – Datascammer (voice)
 Power Rangers Lightspeed Rescue – Smogger (voice)
 Power Rangers Time Force – Mantamobile (voice)
 Power Rangers Wild Force – Alpha 7 (voice)
 Sabrina, the Teenage Witch – Additional Voices
 Safe at Home – Gary Van Sickle
 Summer School – Alan Eakian
 That's So Raven – Teddy
 The Chimp Channel – Timmy Briar (voice)
 The Informant! – Mark Whitacre's Attorney
 The Munsters Today – Howie Buchanan
 Tosh.0 – Fred Willard Fan
 VR Troopers – Minotaurbot (2nd voice)
 Working – Craig, Elevator Passenger
 You Can't Take It with You – Leo
 Mighty Morphin Power Rangers: Once and Always – Alpha 5 (voice)

Films

 Billy & Mandy's Big Boogey Adventure – Billy, Harold
 Billy & Mandy: Wrath of the Spider Queen – Billy, Harold
 Crazy, Stupid, Love – Hardware Store Assistant
 EuroTrip – ADR Performer
 From Up on Poppy Hill – Additional Voices
 Hop – Additional Voices
 Deadly Weapon – Lester
 How I Got into College – Young Enterpriser
 How the Grinch Stole Christmas – Grinch's Answering Machine (voice, uncredited)
 Invader Zim: Enter the Florpus – Zim
 Legends of Oz: Dorothy's Return – Munchkin Suitor
 Mulan (1998) – Chinese Soldier / Zhencha (Scout Hun)
 Osmosis Jones – Male Red Blood Cell
 Race to Space – Keith
 Sabrina Goes to Rome – Stonehenge
 Saving Santa – Orange Haired Elf, Chestnut
 Seal Team – Snap (as Rich Horvitz)
 Shaolin Soccer – Cheating Team Captain
 Shrek – Farquaad Guards
 Snow Dogs – Scooper (dream sequence)
 Son of the Mask – Masked Otis (voice, shared role with Bill Farmer)
 Storm – Danny
 The Adventures of Galgameth – Kinch
 The Angry Birds Movie 2 – Additional Voices
 The Hunchback of Notre Dame – Frollo's Soldiers
 The SpongeBob Movie: Sponge on the Run – Additional Voices
 Turbo: A Power Rangers Movie – Alpha 5

Animation

 As Told by Ginger – Mitchey Mickelberg
 Ben 10 – Grey Matter, Sublimino, Lepidopterran Prisoner, Arnold
 Betsy's Kindergarten Adventures – Scott
 Billy Dilley's Super-Duper Subterranean Summer – Yucky
 Bunnicula – Lugosi (as Rich Horvitz)
 CatDog - Klaus
 Camp Camp – Xemüg (as Rico Bonet)
 Chippy Squirrel – Chippy the Squirrel
 Codename: Kids Next Door – Crayon Boy
 Danger Rangers - Worley the Weasel
 Dave the Barbarian – Ned Frischman
 Dead Meat – Malockawokka
 El Tigre: The Adventures of Manny Rivera – Dr. Chipotle Sr., Diego, Dr. Chipotle Jr.
 Elena of Avalor – Ocho (as Rich Horvitz)
 Finley the Fire Engine – Dex (U.S. version)
 Fish Hooks – Ninja
 Grim & Evil - Billy, Harold
 Helluva Boss – Moxxie, Eddie, Additional Voices
 Invader Zim – Zim, Additional Voices
 Johnny Bravo – Ticket Taker, Bag Boy, Dr. Pencilneck, Guard
 Kick Buttowski: Suburban Daredevil – Mouth
 KIDSCITY: The Village Dome of Kids – Jack Spyro Lloyd, Additional Voices
 Kim Possible – Aviarius
 Mad – Flop-Flips Announcer, Surgeon
 Mixels – Mixadel, Scrud, Splasho, Mixie Cat, Skulzy (Uncredited)
 Mighty Magiswords – various
 Mqueen Zoom – Professor Shortbody
 New Looney Tunes – Impkin the Pumpkin King
 Poochini's Yard – Additional Voices
 Power Players – Additional Voices
 Rocko's Modern Life – Additional Voices
 Rugrats – Various Teenage Characters
 Rapunzel's Tangled Adventure – Jorn, various
 Serta Commercials – Additional Voices
 Shorty McShorts' Shorts – Dudley, Guard
 Skylanders Academy – Kaos
 Squirrel Boy – Rodney J. Squirrel
 Static Shock – Jimmy Osgood
 Teen Titans Go! – Additional Voices
 The Angry Beavers – Daggett Beaver
 The Bite-Sized Adventures of Sam Sandwich – Big Cheese, Fryborg, Salty Pup
 The Buzz on Maggie – Additional Voices
 The Cat&Birdy Warneroonie PinkyBrainy Big Cartoonie Show – Kirby (season 2)
 The Fairly OddParents – Bird
 The Grim Adventures of Billy & Mandy – Billy, Harold, Additional Voices
 The Legend of Prince Valiant – Additional Voices
 The Loud House – Chaz, Joey, Rodney Spokes
 The Mammal Team – Nutbite
 Underfist: Halloween Bash – Billy, Harold
 Wonder Quest – Lacky

Anime
 Dragon Ball Super – Dr. Rota (as Rico Bonet; English dub)
 Duel Masters – Fritz (English dub)
 Howl's Moving Castle – Additional Voices (English dub)
 Pom Poko – Additional Voices (English dub)
 The Wind Rises – Additional Voices (English dub)
 Zatch Bell! – Kanchome, Additional Voices (English dub)

Video games

 Ape Escape: On the Loose – Spike, Child
 Broken Age – Walt'r, The Space Weaver
 Brütal Legend – Kabbage Boy Guitarist, Jack the Lift-Op, Additional Voices
 Cartoon Network: Punch Time Explosion XL - Billy
 Crash Bandicoot 4: It's About Time – Lani-Loli
 Crash of the Titans – Brat Girl, Koo-Ala, Doom-Monkey
 Destroy All Humans! (2005) – Orthopox 13, Suburban Crazy
 Destroy All Humans! 2 – Orthopox 13 / Holopox
 Destroy All Humans! Path of the Furon – Holopox (Orthopox 13), Orthopox 14
 Destroy All Humans! (2020) - Orthopox 13
 Destroy All Humans! 2: Reprobed (2022) - Orthopox 13 / Holopox
 Dragon Ball Legends – Chilled
 EverQuest II – Geredo, Guard Tanglor, Shawdowman, Skeleton, Snorgle Filthwallow, Gerbard the Snitch, Cog Burn, Ogobre, Jubbs Tagglefoot, Gubbo Chaley, Farmer Walcott, Turtle
 Jurassic Park: Dinosaur Battles – Gabriel (as Rich Horvitz)
 League of Legends - Ziggs
 Kinectimals – Bumble
 Metal Gear Solid 4: Guns of the Patriots – PMC Soldiers
 Nickelodeon All-Star Brawl - Zim (voiceover added in the June 2022 update)
 Nicktoons: Attack of the Toybots – Zim (Nintendo DS version only)
 Nickelodeon Extreme Tennis - Zim
 Nickelodeon Kart Racers 3: Slime Speedway - Zim
 Nicktoons MLB – Zim
 Nicktoons Nitro – Zim
 Nickelodeon Party Blast – Zim
 Nicktoons Racing – Daggett "Dag" Beaver
 PlayStation Move Heroes – Lunk, Zoni
 Prototype 2 – Additional Voices
 Psychonauts – Razputin "Raz" Aquato
 Psychonauts 2 – Razputin "Raz" Aquato
 Psychonauts in the Rhombus of Ruin – Razputin "Raz" Aquato
 Ratchet & Clank series – The Zoni, Stuart Zurgo, Tharpods, Additional Voices
 Red Ninja: End of Honor - Additional Voice
 Resistance: Fall of Man – Slipskull
 Rise of the Argonauts – Sinon
 Skylanders: Giants – Kaos
 Skylanders: Imaginators – Kaos
 Skylanders: Spyro's Adventure – Kaos
 Skylanders: SuperChargers – Kaos
 Skylanders: Swap Force – Kaos
 Skylanders: Trap Team – Kaos
 SpongeBob SquarePants featuring Nicktoons: Globs of Doom – Zim
 The Darkness – Berserker Darkling
 The Grim Adventures of Billy & Mandy – Billy, Harold
 WildStar – Creature
 World of Warcraft: Battle for Azeroth - Joma, Patch
 World of Warcraft: Mists of Pandaria – Fel Imp, Saboteur Kip'tilak, Kaz'tik the Manipulator
 World of Warcraft: Warlords of Draenor – Additional Voices
 Zatch Bell! Mamodo Battles – Kanchome
 Zatch Bell! Mamodo Fury – Kanchome

Audiobooks
 Goosebumps: Attack of the Mutant – Skipper Matthews

Awards and nominations
 Nominated – Annie Award for Outstanding Individual Achievement for Voice Acting by a Male Performer in an Animated Television Production for Invader Zim – 2001
 Nominated – Annie Award for Best Voice Acting in an Animated Feature Production for Invader Zim: Enter the Florpus – 2020

Notes

References

External links

 
 

1966 births
Living people
20th-century American comedians
20th-century American male actors
21st-century American comedians
21st-century American male actors
American male comedians
American male television actors
American male video game actors
American male voice actors
American people of Russian descent
American people of Czech descent
American people of European descent
Cartoon Network people
Male actors from Los Angeles
Nickelodeon people